The 2019 Pac-12 Conference women's basketball tournament presented by New York Life was a postseason tournament that was held from March 7–10, 2019 at MGM Grand Garden Arena on the Las Vegas Strip in Paradise, Nevada.

Seeds
Teams were seeded by conference record, with ties broken in the following order:
Tie-breaking procedures for determining all tournament seeding was:
For two-team tie
1. Results of head-to-head competition during the regular season.

2. Each team's record (won-lost percentage) vs. the team occupying the highest position in the final regular standings, and then continuing down through the standings until one team gains an advantage. 
When arriving at another group of tied teams while comparing records, use each team's record (won-lost percentage) against the collective tied teams as a group (prior to that group's own tie-breaking procedure), rather than the performance against individual tied teams.

3. Won-lost percentage against all Division I opponents.

4. Coin toss conducted by the Commissioner or designee.

For multiple-team tie
1. Results (won-lost percentage) of collective head-to-head competition during the regular season among the tied teams.

2. If more than two teams are still tied, each of the tied team's record (won-lost percentage) vs. the team occupying the highest position in the final regular season standings, and then continuing down through the standings, eliminating teams with inferior records, until one team gains an advantage.

When arriving at another group of tied teams while comparing records, use each team's record (won-lost percentage) against the collective tied teams as a group (prior to that group's own tie-breaking procedure), rather than the performance against individual tied teams.

After one team has an advantage and is seeded, all remaining teams in the multiple-team tie-breaker will repeat the multiple-team tie-breaking procedure.

If at any point the multiple-team tie is reduced to two teams, the two-team tie-breaking procedure will be applied.

3. Won-lost percentage against all Division I opponents.

4. Coin toss conducted by the Commissioner or designee.

Schedule

Thursday-Sunday, March 7–10, 2018

The top four seeds received a first-round bye.

Bracket

Note: * denotes overtime

All-Tournament Team
Source:

Most Outstanding Player

See also
 2019 Pac-12 Conference men's basketball tournament

References

External links
Official website - Pac-12 Conference women's basketball tournament

Tournament
Pac-12 Conference women's basketball tournament
Pac-12
2019 in sports in Nevada
Women's sports in Nevada
20th century in Las Vegas
College basketball tournaments in Nevada
College sports tournaments in Nevada